Corbu is a commune in Constanța County, Northern Dobruja, Romania.

The commune includes three villages:
 Corbu - established in 1968 from the merger of Corbu de Jos (historical names: Gargalâcul-Mic) and Corbu de Sus (historical names: Gargalâcul-Mare)
 Luminița (historical names: Șahman and Urumbei)
 Vadu (historical name: Caraharman)

Demographics
At the 2011 census, Corbu had 5,396 Romanians (99.36%), 14 Roma  (0.26%), 5 Turks (0.09%), 6 Tatars (0.11%), 3 Lipovans (0.06%), 7 others (0.13%).

References

Communes in Constanța County
Localities in Northern Dobruja